Thean Kong Thnuah Temple or Jade Emperor God Temple (also known as Thni Kong Tnua) is a Chinese temple located at the foot of Penang Hill in Air Itam, Penang. Completed in 1869, it is the only temple in Malaysia built specifically for the worship of the Jade Emperor (Hokkien: Thinn-kong) and becomes a focal point for the annual Jade Emperor's Birthday celebrations on the 9th day of Chinese New Year.

The temple was featured in Episode 8 of The Amazing Race 16.

History 
The temple was built in the 1860s by members of the ethnic Chinese Hokkien community in Malaysia and underwent a restoration beginning in 2002.

Features 
The temple is located at the foot of Penang Hill and is surrounded by lush greenery. The path leading up to the temple features a flight of stairs with 110 granite steps and its archway is decorated with century-old stone carvings. The temple's architecture is a combination of both Buddhist and Taoist styles. In the first shrine hall, there are three gold-plated Buddha statues while the Jade Emperor God sits in the main shrine hall.

References 

Chinese-Malaysian culture
Buddhist temples in Malaysia
Taoist temples in Malaysia
Religious buildings and structures in Penang
Tourist attractions in George Town, Penang
Religious buildings and structures completed in 1869
19th-century Buddhist temples
19th-century Taoist temples